The Centre Commercial Al Qods is a shopping mall in Algiers, Algeria.

External links
Sidar
The project
Video

Shopping malls in Algeria
Buildings and structures in Algiers
Shopping malls established in 2008
Tourist attractions in Algiers
Economy of Algiers
2008 establishments in Algeria
21st-century architecture in Algeria